Ravenwood High School is a public high school located in Brentwood, Tennessee, which serves the eastern part of Williamson County.

Opened in 2002, the $24.5 million facility, designed by architect Charlie Johnson, progressively grew its student body, beginning with only 540 students in grades nine and ten, 32 teachers, and 7 staff members. Currently enrolling approximately 2,000 students, Ravenwood aims "to become a model of successful community collaboration with the purpose of developing all learners to be able to work, learn and lead in the 21st century." The mission of Ravenwood is "to develop a community of learners that cultivates the intellect, ability, and character of each person within it." The school colors are red, black, and gold. The mascot is the Raptor, a bird of prey represented by the Red Tail Hawk. Ravenwood High School was ranked in Newsweek magazine's list of the top 1,000 public schools in the United States.

Academics
Most students at Ravenwood take four academic classes, two electives, one directed study, and a lunch/advocate period. Credits are distributed along a fairly standard path, with most students taking English, mathematics, foreign language, science, and social studies. One year and a half of physical education is also required. The standard high school diploma requires twenty-three credits. In addition, two honors diplomas are offered, the Williamson County Honors Diploma and the Ravenwood Honors Diploma. Ravenwood ranks students using weighted GPA. Ravenwood also offers Advanced Placement (AP) courses.

Ravenwood also has a Media Center with multiple computers and labs for students and faculty to use as well as a library. The Ravenwood Media Center library holds over 16,000 online resources, books, magazines, reference works, audio-visual materials and equipment. Resources are remotely accessible to students and teachers.

References

External links

Public high schools in Tennessee
Schools in Williamson County, Tennessee
2002 establishments in Tennessee
Educational institutions established in 2002